Jugalji Mathurji Thakor   is an Indian politician and a member of the Bharatiya Janata Party. He is the member of the Parliament of India representing Gujarat State in the Rajya Sabha, the upper house on 5 July 2019.

References 

Living people
Bharatiya Janata Party politicians from Gujarat
Rajya Sabha members from Gujarat
People from Mehsana district
Year of birth missing (living people)